Workfare in the United Kingdom is a system of welfare regulations put into effect by UK governments at various times. Individuals subject to workfare must undertake work in return for their welfare benefit payments or risk losing them. Workfare policies are politically controversial. Supporters claim that such policies help people move off welfare and into employment whereas critics argue that they are analogous to slavery or indentured servitude and counterproductive in decreasing unemployment.

History

"Workfare" began in the UK in the early 1990s with the first Major government's "Community Action" scheme in 1993 which was replaced in 1996 by the better known "Project Work" which was subsequently replaced by New Labour's "New Deal". Welfare-to-work or "active labour market policies" date back to 1986 and the second Thatcher government's introduction of compulsory "Restart" interviews for unemployed claimants. Restart lasted until 1991 when it was superseded by the "make work" scheme "Employment Action" which lasted until 1993. "Make work schemes" are not workfare, but they are a component part of policies such as welfare-to-work, "active labour market policies" and "welfare reform".

The distinction between workfare and "make work schemes" is that workfare is "work for benefits", either for a company in the public sector, or what has been called "bogus volunteering" for a charity. The work is undertaken as a condition of being able to claim social security payments such as unemployment benefit. This is in contrast to arrangements where claimants receive social security payments plus "a small supplemental payment".

Welfare-to-work/"active labour market policies" first appeared in the early 1980s at time of mass unemployment. The state-owned Manpower Services Commission had been created by the Heath government in the early 1970s whilst full employment existed. It ran the Youth Opportunities Programme which was introduced by the Callaghan Labour government in the late 1970s and was continued and extended by the incoming Conservative government, being replaced in 1983 by the better-known Youth Training Scheme (YTS).

Although workfare did exist in the 2000s under the New Labour government, it was not widely publicised nor widely used. In the early 2010s under the Conservative-led coalition government it became widely used and widely known. A large scale opposition movement led to dozens of organizations withdrawing from what were then seven different schemes. This was reduced to five schemes after the DWP announced in November 2015 that it was "not renewing" two of the schemes, "Community Work Placements" and "Mandatory Work Activity".

In November 2011, the Prime Minister's Office announced proposals under which Jobseeker's Allowance claimants who have not found a job once they have been through a work programme will do a 26-week placement in the community for 30 hours a week. According to The Guardian in 2012, under the Government's Community Action Programme people who have been out of work for a number of years "must work for six months unpaid, including at profit-making businesses, in order to keep their benefits".

These developments followed years of concern and discussion by people both for and against such schemes. In 1999, the UK charity Child Poverty Action Group expressed concern that a government announcement that single parents and the disabled may have to attend repeated interviews for jobs under threat of losing benefits was "a step towards a US-style workfare system". The Social Security Secretary at the time, Alistair Darling, described the plan as "harsh, but justifiable", claiming that it would help address the "poverty of expectation" of many claimants.

In 2008, research undertaken by the Centre for Regional Economic and Social Research (CRESR) for the Department for Work and Pensions (DWP) found that there was little evidence that workfare programmes increased the likelihood of finding paid employment and could instead reduce the prospect of finding paid employment by "limiting the time available for job search and by failing to provide the skills and experience valued by employers". Despite the report, Lord Jones, former Minister of State for Trade and Investment, said in April 2010 that Britain needed to adopt American-style workfare.

During their 2013 annual conference the Conservative Party announced a new scheme, called Help to Work, the workfare aspect of which "Community Work Placements" expected claimants to work for up to 30 hours a week for 26 weeks in return for Jobseeker's Allowance (JSA). The scheme was introduced in April 2014, but scrapped in November 2015.

Schemes
A number of different workfare schemes have been introduced in the UK. The anti-workfare group Boycott Workfare list eight schemes involving the risk of benefit loss (directly and indirectly).

Help to Work (2014–2015)
Mandatory Work Activity (2011–2015)
Work Programme (2011–2017)
Community Action Programme
Sector-Based Work Academies
Work Experience
Steps to Work (Northern Ireland only) 
Day One Support for Young People Trailblazer
Derbyshire "Trailblazer" Mandatory Youth Activity Programme

Support

Chris Grayling, the UK's Minister for Employment between 2010 and 2012, criticised what he called the "Polly Toynbee left", saying that they failed to understand the modern labour market.

Criticism
The Trade Union Congress (TUC), a federation of trade unions in the United Kingdom, has stated that workfare is exploitation of the unemployed, "paying" them below the minimum wage. The TUC  also highlight that workfare is unfair to paid workers who find themselves in competition with unpaid workers. In these cases the TUC claims that the result would be job losses and the deterioration of pay, overtime or other conditions. Employers who opted not to use workfare workers would also find themselves competing with other firms who are "effectively being subsidised".

The Guardian newspaper claimed in February 2012 that businesses in the UK which take staff via "work for your benefits programmes" included Asda, Maplin, Primark, Holland & Barrett, Boots, and McDonald's. The policy is similar to that which the Conservative Party administration hoped to introduce in the mid to late 1990s, which would most likely have been carried through had John Major not been defeated by Tony Blair in the 1997 general election.

Critics also ascertain that the majority of menial, low paid jobs would end up being carried out by people on workfare who, because they are working but unpaid, would not be counted among the unemployment figures. In an article in the Huffington Post, Dr Simon Duffy likened workfare to slavery. The Green Party of England and Wales has also voiced its opposition to workfare.

Academics have argued that, as workfare participants are essentially providing work that is beneficial to the employer, whether public or private, they should be granted employment status (as a worker or an employee) or, at least, employment protection, even regardless of status.

Academic analysis
Academic analysis by the Department of Work and Pensions has cast doubt on the effectiveness of workfare policies. After surveying the international evidence available from America, Canada and Australia the report states:

Backlash
Opposition to workfare has caused a number of companies to withdraw from "workfare" schemes. A number of organisations including Maplin, Waterstones, Sainsbury's, TK Maxx and the Arcadia Group withdrew from the scheme in early 2012. Argos and Superdrug announced they were suspending their involvement pending talks with ministers. Clothing retailer Matalan subsequently suspended its involvement in the scheme in order to conduct a review of the terms of such placements, with a spokesman for the DWP saying "The scheme is voluntary and no one is forced to take part and the threat of losing the benefit only starts once a week has passed on the placement - this was designed to provide certainty to employers and the individuals taking part"

Controversies

Tesco
There was controversy later in February 2012 following the involvement of the Tesco supermarket chain in a government workfare scheme linked to the payment of benefits. An advert appeared on the Jobseekers' Plus website in which Tesco sought permanent workers in exchange for expenses and Jobseeker's Allowance. After the advert was highlighted by users of Facebook and Twitter, the supermarket claimed its appearance was a mistake and that it was intended to be "an advert for work experience with a guaranteed job interview at the end of it as part of a Government-led work experience scheme". A protest about this advert later caused the temporary closure of a Tesco store near the Houses of Parliament.

Poundland

The discount retailer Poundland's participation in a workfare scheme has been controversial. A graduate took the Department of Work and Pensions to Court arguing that participation in a workfare scheme was a breach of her human rights guaranteed by the European Convention on Human Rights. Caitlin Reilly and Jamieson Wilson lost the case but the decision was reversed on appeal. However, the appeal decision was made primarily on technical grounds, and the judge found no breach of Article 4 of the European Convention on Human Rights.

Home Retail Group

Home Retail Group, the parent company of Argos and Homebase, were also widely criticised for their involvement in Workfare. It was reported they would not offer jobs to people who successfully completed the scheme (with Argos simply issuing certificates of completion to those wanting jobs). A key moment for those who opposed Workfare was when a poster produced for internal purposes by Homebase indicating that unpaid work in the scheme was a way of reducing operating costs was leaked to the public. After this, Home Retail Group soon announced they would stop participating in the scheme.

See also
Boycott Workfare
Economic oppression
Exploitation of labour
Forced labour
Involuntary servitude
Refusal of work
Unfree labour
Wage slavery
Work ethic
Workhouses in the United Kingdom
Youth unemployment in the United Kingdom

References

 
Welfare reform
Unfree labour